The Central District of Sari County is a district (bakhsh) in Sari County, Mazandaran Province, Iran. At the 2006 census, its population was 395,716, in 107,378 families.  The District has one city: Sari. The District has six rural districts (dehestan): Esfivard-e Shurab Rural District, Kolijan Rostaq-e Sofla Rural District, Mazkureh Rural District, Miandorud-e Kuchak Rural District, Rudpey-ye Jonubi Rural District, and Rudpey-ye Shomali Rural District.

References 

Sari County
Districts of Mazandaran Province